Buh may refer to
Novyi Buh, a city in Ukraine
Southern Bug, a river in Ukraine
Buh Cossacks
Buh Township, Morrison County, Minnesota, United States
Buh, Kapurthala, a village in India
Buh Gujran, a village in India
El Buh, a town in Somalia
El Buh District in Somalia
Saad Buh, a Sufi from Mauritania

See also
BUH (disambiguation)